was a Japanese author known for his unique style and self-introspective themes. His major works include "The Moon Over the Mountain" and "Light, Wind and Dreams" with the former being published in many Japanese textbooks.

During his life he wrote about 20 works, including unfinished works, typically inspired by Classical Chinese stories and his own life experiences.

Early life 
Atsushi Nakajima was born in Yotsuya ward, Tokyo, Japan on 5 May 1909. He was born into a family of Confucian Scholars with his father, grandfather and three uncles being scholars themselves. Nakajima's childhood is filled with turbulent times with his parents divorcing two years into their marriage and less than one year since Nakajima was born. The infant Nakajima was then sent to Saitama Prefecture where his grandparents lived, where he would be taken care of. Unfortunately one year after he was sent to his grandparents, his grandfather died.

In February 1914, he would be sent to his father who at this point had remarried. His father worked a teaching job and often transferred to many different locations, In 1918 he would move to Seoul and later on in 1920 he also moved to Manchuria for his father's teaching job. Because of this teaching job, the young Nakajima often transferred schools which led to a feeling of isolation. Despite his frequent transfers however, Nakajima was known for being an intelligent student who consistently received good grades.

His family life was equally rough as he was not very close to his father and his stepmother would abuse him. He would also remain as an only child until 1914, where his step-mother gave birth to his half-sister, unfortunately his step-mother would die during childbirth. His father then remarried for the third time in 1924 but his new stepmother would also continue to be equally abusive. Through his childhood, Nakajima had poor health. He would develop asthma at the age of 17 which would continue for the rest of his life.

Despite his family's deep roots in Chinese studies and Nakajima's knowledge on the topic, he decided to enroll into the University of Tokyo where he would study Japanese literature. He would make his graduation thesis on the topic of Aestheticism. The thesis, titled "The Study of Aestheticism" traces the influences of modern Japanese literature to Edgar Allan Poe, Oscar Wilde and Charles Baudelaire. The thesis then also proceeds to analyze the works of Tanizaki Jun'ichirō, Mori Ōgai, Ueda Bin and Nagai Kafū. After graduating, he would get married with Taka Hashimoto.

Literary career 
His literary career started very early into his life. After graduating from his school in Seoul, he would join the Tokyo First Higher School's (第一高等学校) literary program where he would begin writing fiction. In 1927 he would begin publishing in the school's literary magazine and by 1929 he would become a member of the editorial staff. During this period he would begin showing his signature style of setting his stories in exotic locations such as China or Korea along with recurring themes of self-doubt, questions on the meaning of life, isolation, fate and the nature of human existence. Some of his later works also display a sense of irony and satire.

Despite his skills as an author, Nakajima barely published any of his works to literary magazines due to him having high literary standards and Nakajima lacking the confidence to publish in these journals.

The Moon Over the Mountain 
The story is derived from a story from the Tang dynasty period. The story was first published in the February 1942 issue of Bungakukai.

The Moon Over the Mountain tells the story of Yuan Can who recently had heard about a man-eating tiger roaming around his area. One day he encountered the tiger and the tiger started speaking to him. Yuan Can discovered that the tiger was his friend named Li Zheng (李徴), Li Zheng was smart and could qualify as a government official but his true ambition was to be a poet. Unfortunately, he failed and started working as a government official. While traveling for official business one day, Li Zheng claims that he went insane and transformed into a tiger. Li Zheng claims that this was because of the "cowardly pride" and "arrogant shame" he harbored within him which caused him to transform into the tiger. Li Zheng laments that as a tiger he could no longer become a famous poet, the two then parted ways.

Teaching Job 
In 1933, he would accept a teaching position at Yokohama Girls' Higher School. During his time in the School, Nakajima would be exposed to more of western literature. Specifically, the works of Blaise Pascal, Anatole France and Robert Louis Stevenson. During this time he would also translate western works into Japanese including the works of D. H. Lawrence, Aldous Huxley and Franz Kafka. During this time, he would also continue writing fiction.

Micronesia and Palau 
In 1941, he would resign from his teaching job and pick up a job with the Japanese government working as an editor for a Japanese language textbook set to be published in Palau. He had also thought that the warmer climate in Palau would cure his asthma. Nakajima's choice to visit the southern seas may have been influenced by him reading the works of Robert Louis Stevenson, specifically Stevenson's Vailima Letters which described Stevenson's stay in Samoa. After some time in Palau, he would take a boat to Micronesia on 15 September 1941 for the purpose of inspecting the schools in the region. He would return to Palau in 5 November 1941. During this part of his life, Nakajima would keep a diary to keep note of his experiences there. He would record the things which interested him such as the native culture and practices.

In letters he wrote, Nakajima disagrees with the Japanese exploitation of the island natives. He wished that he could do more for the people of Palau and Micronesia other than teaching them. He would also write that he had not experienced any asthma attacks, but instead felt lethargic due to the tropical heat. The food in Micronesia supplied by the Japanese were also lacking. Because of this, he wished to quit his job as soon as possible. By the end of 1941, Nakajima had requested a transfer and returned to Japan in March 1942.

Final years 
In 1942, Nakajima contracted pneumonia after returning from Palau. While bedridden for two months, he published Light, Wind and Dreams, a fictionalized biography of Robert Louis Stevenson. The story was critically acclaimed, even becoming a finalist for the Akutagawa Prize.

At this point he resigned from his job at the South Seas Agency and fully devoted himself to being a writer. However, this did not last long. His health greatly declined due to the asthma medication he had taken. He was immediately hospitalized. When he was hospitalized, no one expected him to die. His father, expecting his stay to be short, did not visit him in the hospital. After a night of asthma attacks, Nakajima died on the morning of 4 December 1942.

In popular culture 
A character based on Atsushi Nakajima is featured in the manga series Bungo Stray Dogs, where major literary figures from Japan and across the world are presented as teenagers and young adults. In the series, Nakajima works for the Armed Detective Agency and has a supernatural ability named after his short story "The Moon Over the Mountain" which allows him to transform into a tiger.

Nakajima also appears in the online game Bungo and Alchemist, an online collectible card game with characters based on literary figures.

Bibliography 

  (1942)
  (1943)

English Translations 

 Legend of the Master (名人伝), translated by Reiko Seri and Doc Kane. Kobe, Japan, Maplopo, 2020

See also 
Japanese literature
List of Japanese authors

References

External links
 Maplopo | Atsushi Nakajima, "Legend of the Master" 
 J'Lit | Authors : Atsushi Nakajima | Books from Japan 
 
 

1909 births
1942 deaths
20th-century Japanese male writers
Writers from Tokyo
20th-century Japanese novelists
Japanese male short story writers
University of Tokyo alumni
Deaths from pneumonia in Japan